The Princess Diaries, Volume VII and 3/4: Valentine Princess is a young adult book in the Princess Diaries series.  Written by Meg Cabot, it was released in 2006 by Harper Collins Publishers and is the fourth novella is the series.

Plot

Mia Thermopolis continues with her diary entries, and this time it's after the fourth novel, Princess in Waiting. Mia Thermopolis has no one to spend Valentine's Day with. Her boyfriend, Michael Moscovitz, isn't interested in Valentine's Day. Lilly Moscovitz, her best friend, suggests that Valentine's Day is a commercialized holiday for corporate interests. Eventually, Tina Hakim Baba suggests that the entire group should watch romantic movies at her house. Her mother and her algebra teacher, Mr. Gianni, are planning to spend Valentine's Day at a romantic restaurant. Mia has to consider a Valentine's Day gift for Michael, and she decided to give him a coupon booklet. Lilly received a heart shaped diamond necklace from Boris. Although Mia thought she would be alone for Valentine's Day, she finds out that she is not alone...   

2006 American novels
The Princess Diaries novels
American young adult novels

HarperCollins books